Růžová is a municipality and village in Děčín District in the Ústí nad Labem Region of the Czech Republic. It has about 600 inhabitants. The folk architecture in the village of Kamenická Stráň is well preserved and is protected by law as a village monument zone.

Administrative parts
The village of Kamenická Stráň is an administrative part of Růžová.

References

Villages in Děčín District
Bohemian Switzerland